Cyclin-dependent kinase 5 activator 2 is an enzyme that in humans is encoded by the CDK5R2 gene.

The protein encoded by this gene is a neuron-specific activator of CDK5 kinase. It associates with CDK5 to form an active kinase. This protein and neuron-specific CDK5 activator CDK5R1/p39NCK5A both share limited similarity to cyclins, and thus may define a distinct family of cyclin-dependent kinase-activating proteins.

Interactions 

CDK5R2 has been shown to interact with Actinin, alpha 1.

References 

طراحی سایت فروشگاهی

External links

Further reading